In classical architecture, a pilaster is an architectural element used to give the appearance of a supporting column and to articulate an extent of wall, with only an ornamental function. It consists of a flat surface raised from the main wall surface, usually treated as though it were a column, with a capital at the top, plinth (base) at the bottom, and the various other column elements. In contrast to a pilaster, an engaged column or buttress can support the structure of a wall and roof above.

In human anatomy, a pilaster is a ridge that extends vertically across the femur, which is unique to modern humans. Its structural function is unclear.

Definition
In discussing Leon Battista Alberti's use of pilasters, which Alberti reintroduced into wall-architecture, Rudolf Wittkower wrote: "The pilaster is the logical transformation of the column for the decoration of a wall. It may be defined as a flattened column which has lost its three-dimensional and tactile value."

A pilaster appears with a capital. and entablature, also in "low-relief" or flattened against the wall. Generally, a pilaster often repeats all parts and proportions of an order column; however, unlike it, a pilaster is usually devoid of entasis.

Pilasters often appear on the sides of a door frame or window opening on the facade of a building, and are sometimes paired with columns or pillars set directly in front of them at some distance away from the wall, which support a roof structure above, such as a portico. These vertical elements can also be used to support a recessed archivolt around a doorway. The pilaster can be replaced by ornamental brackets supporting the entablature or a balcony over a doorway.

When a pilaster appears at the corner intersection of two walls it is known as a canton.

As with a column, a pilaster can have a plain or fluted surface to its profile and can be represented in the mode of numerous architectural styles. During the Renaissance and Baroque architects used a range of pilaster forms. In the giant order pilasters appear as two storeys tall, linking floors in a single unit.

The fashion of using this element from ancient Greek and Roman architecture was adopted in the Italian Renaissance, gained wide popularity with Greek Revival architecture, and continues to be seen in some modern architecture.

Pilaster is frequently also referred to as a non-ornamental, load-bearing architectural element in non-classical architecture where a structural load must be carried by a wall or column next to a wall and the wall thickens to accommodate the structural requirements of the wall.

Gallery

See also
 Glossary of architecture
 Classical order
 Lesene
 Post and lintel

Notes

References
 Lewis, Philippa, and Gillian Darley (1986). Dictionary of Ornament.  New York: Pantheon.

External links

Architectural elements
Columns and entablature